Podohedriella is a genus of green algae in the family Selenastraceae.

References

Sphaeropleales genera
Sphaeropleales